Louise Alexandra Delamere (born 17 June 1969) is an English actress, best known for her roles as Lia in the Channel 4 comedy drama No Angels and Colette Sheward in the BBC medical drama Holby City.

Career
Delamere appeared in Agatha Christie's Poirot, in the episode  Evil Under the Sun, where she played Arlena Stuart-Marshall, an actress who is murdered on a beach. She was featured in the Cadfael episode "The Holy Thief" and appeared in the BBC crime show Waking the Dead as Elaine Ashcroft, again playing a murder victim in the fourth season finale Thin Air.

She also had a role in the television drama The Chatterley Affair and has appeared in Torchwood. She played the recurring character Marion James in the fifth series of Waterloo Road. Delamere appeared as regular character Colette Sheward in BBC medical drama Holby City from 3 December 2013 until 4 November 2014.

Personal life
Delamere is married to actor Stephen Mangan. They have three sons: Harry (born October 2007), Frank (born 2010), and Jack (born March 2016).

She has three brothers; her younger brother is the actor Matthew Delamere, and one of her older brothers is the director Robert Delamere.

Filmography

References

External links

1969 births
Living people
People from Wallasey
English film actresses
English television actresses
English stage actresses
Alumni of the Royal Conservatoire of Scotland
Actresses from Cheshire
20th-century English actresses
21st-century English actresses